Mount Meredith is a mountain located in the Catskill Mountains of New York southeast of Meridale. Rattail Ridge is located east of Mount Meredith.

References

Mountains of Delaware County, New York
Mountains of New York (state)